MKG may refer to:
 Michael Kidd-Gilchrist, American basketball player
 Mohandas Karamchand Gandhi, Indian leader
 Musashi-Kosugi Station, JR East station code
 Muskegon County Airport (IATA code MKG)
 Gotland Military Command
 MKG Group, European company
 mkg, former abbreviation for kilopondmetre